Atlético Nacional is a professional Colombian football team based in Medellín. Considered to be one of the strongest clubs from Colombia, it is one of the most consistent clubs in the country. Atlético Nacional was founded in 1947 by Julio Ortiz, Jorge Osorio Cadavid, Jorge Gómez, Arturo Torres, Gilberto Molina, Alberto Eastman, Raúl Zapata Lotero and Luis Alberto Villegas Lopera.

This is a list of notable footballers who have played for Atlético Nacional. They must have had at least 100 appearances with the club, have made a significant contribution for the achievement of a title or played for the national team while in the club.

List of players

References

Atlético Nacional